Sélibaby is a department of Guidimaka Region in of southern Mauritania.

List of municipalities in the department 
The Sélibaby department is made up of following municipalities:

 Hassi Cheggar
 Ould M'Bonny
 Sélibabi
 Souvi
 Tachott
 Arr
 Ajar
 Wompou
 Baydam
 Ghabou
 Gouraye.

In 2000, the entire population of the Sélibaby Department has a total of 128 331 inhabitants  (64 149 men and 64 162 women).

References 

Departments of Mauritania